The 2013–14 Ukrainian Premier League season was the 23rd since its establishment.

A total of sixteen teams participated in the league. Fifteen teams from last season's competition and one promoted club from the 2012–13 Ukrainian First League formed the league. The competition commenced on the 12 July 2013 when Tavriya Simferopol hosted Zorya Luhansk. Eighteen rounds were played prior to the winter recess. The competition was affected by the political turmoil that affected Ukraine during the spring session.

Russian invasion and its effects on the league

In November 2013, during the winter break of the Ukrainian Premier League, a wave of demonstrations and civil unrest labelled Euromaidan started in Ukraine. The competition was to resume on 1 March 2014, but due to the Russian invasion continuing on with the Crimean crisis, the Premier League delayed the start of the spring stage. A decision was made by the Ukrainian Premier League to resume the competition on 15 March.

After the annexation of Crimea by Russia in March 2014 the teams from Crimea, namely Sevastopol and Tavriya Simferopol, continued to participate in the competition.

During the May 2014 pro-Russian conflict in Ukraine the Football Federation of Ukraine (after being advised to do so by the Ukrainian Interior Ministry) decided that all matches across all Ukrainian leagues, as well as the 2014 Ukrainian Cup Final, would be played behind closed doors for security reasons.

The unrest in Ukraine since November 2013 led to an unexpected sense of unity among rival Ukrainian football fans. Various formerly bitter rival football fans (also those from Russophone cities in Ukraine) held pro-Ukrainian Unity marches.

Teams

Promoted
FC Sevastopol, champion of the 2012-13 Ukrainian First League (returning after absence of 2 seasons)

Stal Alchevsk were to be promoted after finishing runners-up but their club administration refused promotion.

Hoverla Uzhhorod, the 15th placed team was allowed to stay in the Premier League after they passed attestation.

Metalurh Zaporizhya, the last-placed of the 2012–13 Ukrainian Premier League was to be relegated to the Ukrainian First League at the end of the previous season but since no other team applied for entry from the Ukrainian First League they remained in the competition.

Location map

Stadiums
The following stadiums are regarded as home grounds:

Personnel and sponsorship

Managerial changes

Notes:
 For the Round 14 match Metalist Kharkiv was managed by Ihor Rakhayev while manager Myron Markevych was hospitalized with trauma.

Qualification to European competitions for 2014–15
 Since Ukraine finished in seventh place of the UEFA country ranking after the 2012–13 season, the league will have the same number of qualifiers for UEFA Europa League 2014–15. The Ukrainian Cup winner qualifies for the play-off round.

Qualified teams
 After the 24th Round, Shakhtar Donetsk qualified for European football for the 2014–15 season.
 During the 26th Round, Dnipro Dnipropetrovsk qualified for European football for the 2014–15 season. 
 During the 28th Round Shakhtar Donetsk qualified for the 2014–15 UEFA Champions League after defeating Illichivets.  
 Metalist Kharkiv qualified for European football for the 2014–15 season after defeating FC Sevastopol in their postponed Round 20 match.
 Shakhtar Donetsk qualified for the 2014–15 UEFA Champions League Group Stage during Round 29 after they defeated Zorya Luhansk. (C)
 After the 29th Round, Dynamo Kyiv qualified the 2014–15 UEFA Europa League. 
 After the 29th Round, Chornomorets Odesa qualified the 2014–15 UEFA Europa League 3rd qualifying round. 
 Dynamo Kyiv, by winning the Ukrainian Cup, and with Sevilla (Spain) winning the 2013–14 UEFA Europa League, qualified for the 2014–15 UEFA Europa Group stage. 
 Dnipro Dnipropetrovsk qualified for the 2014–15 UEFA Champions League 3rd qualifying round after they defeated Metalurh Donetsk in Round 30. After that victory Metalist Kharkiv qualified the 2014–15 UEFA Europa League playoff round.
 Zorya Luhansk qualified for the 2014–15 UEFA Europa League 2nd qualifying round after Metalurh Donetsk was excluded from participating by the UEFA Club Financial Control Body due to failing to comply with Financial Fair Play regulations.

League table

Results

The following table displays match results between each team in the competition.

Positions by round
The following table represents the teams' position after each round in the competition. The competition resumes with the spring stage with Round 21 due to the postponement of the competition due to the civil unrest in the country after the riots in Kyiv and continuing on with the Crimean crisis. Originally scheduled Round 19 was played 15–17 April after Round 25 and Round 20 was played 23–24 April after Round 26.

Season statistics

Top goalscorers

The top ten goalscorers were as follows:

Notes:
 Russian Premier League club Rubin Kazan signed Marko Devich during the winter break.

Hat-tricks

Notes:
 (*) Asterisk identifies players who scored four goals (poker).

Awards

Monthly awards

Season awards
The laureates of the 2013–14 UPL season were:
 Best player:  Yevhen Konoplyanka (Dnipro Dnipropetrovsk)
 Best coach:  Mircea Lucescu (Shakhtar Donetsk)
 Best goalkeeper:  Andriy Pyatov (Shakhtar Donetsk)
 Best arbiter:  Yuriy Mozharovsky (Lviv)
 Best young player:  Serhiy Bolbat (Metalurh Donetsk)
 Best goalscorer:  Luiz Adriano (Shakhtar Donetsk)

See also
2013–14 Ukrainian First League
2013–14 Ukrainian Premier League Reserves and Under 19
2013–14 Ukrainian Second League
2013–14 Ukrainian Cup
2013–14 UEFA Europa League
2013–14 UEFA Champions League

References

Ukrainian Premier League seasons
1
Ukr